Re Barings plc (No 5) [2000] 1 BCLC 523 is a leading UK company law case, concerning directors' duties of care and skill.  The case is formally identified and cited as "No 5", though some observers regard it as the sixth in the saga of litigation concerning Barings Bank.

Facts
Nick Leeson was a dishonest futures trader in Singapore for the Barings Bank. He traded in the front office and also did work, in breach of an internal audit recommendation, in the back office, auditing his own team's trades. This allowed him to effectively act as his own supervisor. Leeson abused this situation to secretly make increasingly large unauthorized trades on his employer's behalf. He fraudulently doctored the bank's accounts, and reported large profits, while trading at losses. After the 1995 Kobe earthquake, the stock market went into a downward spiral, and the truth of his losses was uncovered, bankrupting Barings Bank. The Secretary of State sought director disqualification orders under the Company Directors Disqualification Act 1986 against three directors of Barings for their failure to supervise his activities. They were alleged to be incompetent, and therefore "unfit to be concerned in the management of a company" (sections 6-8).

Judgement

High Court
Jonathan Parker J held that the three directors should be disqualified. Unfitness was determined by the objective standard that should ordinarily be expected of people fit to be directors of companies. Directors must inform themselves of company affairs and join in with other directors to supervise those affairs. Having no adequate system of monitoring was therefore a breach of this standard. Directors may delegate functions, but they nevertheless remain responsible for those functions being carried out.  Furthermore, the degree of a director's remuneration will be a relevant factor in determining the degree of responsibility with which a director must reckon.

Court of Appeal
Morritt LJ, Waller LJ and Mummery LJ upheld Jonathan Parker J's decision in full. Morritt LJ delivered judgment for the whole court.

See also

UK company law
US corporate law
Gross negligence
Business judgment rule

Notes

References
WT Allen, JB Jacobs and LE Strine Jr, 'Function over Form: A Reassessment of Standards of Review in Delaware Corporation Law' (2001) 26 Delaware Journal of Corporate Law 859

United Kingdom company case law
English tort case law
High Court of Justice cases
1999 in case law
1999 in British law